Geoff or Geoffrey Thomas may refer to:

 Geoffrey Thomas (academic) (born 1941), president of Kellogg College, Oxford
 Geoffrey Thomas (businessman) (born 1959), Australian businessman
 Geoff Thomas (footballer, born 1948) (1948–2013), Welsh football player (Swansea City)
 Geoff Thomas (footballer, born 1964), English international football player (Crystal Palace)
 Geoff Thomas (pastor) (born 1938), Welsh pastor
 Geoff Thomas (tennis), Australian tennis player

See also
Jeffrey Thomas (disambiguation)